AfroBasket 2013 was the 27th FIBA Africa Championship, played under the rules of FIBA, the world governing body for basketball, and the FIBA Africa thereof. The tournament was hosted by Ivory Coast from August 20 to 31, all games were played at the Palais des Sports de Treichville, Abidjan.

Angola defeated Egypt 57–40 in the final to win their eleventh title.

Format
The sixteen teams were split into four groups. Every team advanced to the knockout stage and participated at the Round of 16. The winners advanced to the quarterfinals to play out the champion. The losers from those quarterfinals played for the places 5–8. The defeated teams from the round of 16 were ranked by their preliminary round results and played placement games for the places 9–16.

Venue

Qualification

The following national teams have secured qualification:

Squads

Group stage
The draw was held on March 30, 2013.

Group A

|}

Group B

|}

Group C

|}

Group D

|}

Knockout stage

5th place bracket

Round of 16

Quarterfinals

5–8th place semifinals

Semifinals

Fifteenth place match

Thirteenth place match

Eleventh place match

Ninth place match

Seventh place match

Fifth place match

Third place match

Final

Final standings

Awards

All-Tournament Team
  Souleymane Diabate
  Carlos Morais
  Maleye Ndoye
  Eduardo Mingas
  Assem Marei

Statistical Leaders

Points

Rebounds

Assists

Steals

Blocks

Minutes

See also
 2013 FIBA Africa Clubs Champions Cup

References

External links
Official website

 
2013
2013 in African basketball
2013 in Ivorian sport
International basketball competitions hosted by Ivory Coast
August 2013 sports events in Africa